Indoor cross country is a relatively new test of equestrian skills. It involves the use of both show jumping-type obstacles and cross country-type obstacles (including banks, water, logs, and brush fences) in a course of an indoor arena.

Indoor cross-country has mainly been performed in Europe. However, Britain offered its first competition at the British Open Show Jumping Championships in April, 2006. Such was the success of this event, which included riders such as Zara Phillips and Jeanette Brakewell, that the event is now one of the main attractions at the British Open. In Autumn 2006 the Royal Fair in Toronto launched their own version after consultation with the British Open organisers.

Rails down add penalties to the rider's score, as does going over time.

External links 
 (this goes directly to a video of an indoor derby)
Show jumping/

Eventing